The 1928 World Table Tennis Championships – Swaythling Cup (men's team) was the second edition of the men's team championship.

Hungary defeated Austria and England 5–2 in a three way final playoff for the gold medal. The three teams had tied in the main pool, finishing with a 7-1 match record.

Final table

Final Playoffs
The final consisted of a three-way playoff between Hungary, Austria and England who all finished with a 7–2 record in the main table.

See also
List of World Table Tennis Championships medalists

References

-